Alexander Karpovsky (born September 23, 1975) is an American director, actor, screenwriter, producer and film editor. He is best known for playing Ray Ploshansky on the HBO comedy-drama series Girls and Craig Petrosian on the Amazon series Homecoming.

Early life and education
Alex Karpovsky was born in Israel and raised in Newton, Massachusetts. He earned a bachelor's degree from Boston University before receiving a master's degree in visual ethnography at the University of Oxford.

Career
His debut feature, The Hole Story, earned him a slot in Filmmaker magazine's 25 new faces of independent film. His subsequent feature-length films include Woodpecker (SXSW Film Festival, 2008), Trust Us, This Is All Made Up (SXSW Film Festival, 2009), Rubberneck (Tribeca Film Festival, 2012), and Red Flag (LA Film Festival, 2012), the latter two of which were released as a double feature in New York City's Lincoln Center Theater. In addition to these films, Alex has directed episodes of TV, commercials, and music videos.

As an actor, he played Ray Ploshansky in the HBO comedy series Girls and has portrayed characters in films that have been featured at Sundance, Cannes, SXSW, Berlinale, Los Angeles & Tribeca film festivals. Karpovsky also appeared in the Coen Brothers' films Inside Llewyn Davis and Hail, Caesar!, was a series regular on Amazon's Homecoming, and has a leading role in the NBC/Peacock limited series, Angelyne.

Karpovsky has read hundreds of stories for live and radio audiences, including NPR's Selected Shorts, The Paris Review, The New York Times' Modern Love, n+1, Grand Theft Auto IV, and This American Life.

Filmography

Actor

Television

Music video

Video game

Writer/director

References

External links

Living people
Alumni of the University of Oxford
American film editors
American male film actors
American male screenwriters
American people of Russian-Jewish descent
Jewish American male actors
People from Williamsburg, Brooklyn
Actors from Newton, Massachusetts
Writers from Newton, Massachusetts
Film directors from New York City
Film directors from Massachusetts
Screenwriters from New York (state)
Screenwriters from Massachusetts
1975 births
21st-century American Jews